The  Battle of Riyadh was a minor battle of the Unification War between Rashidi and Saudi forces. It occurred on 13 January 1902, in Masmak Fort in Riyadh, the capital of present-day Saudi Arabia.

In late 1901, following the end of the Second Saudi State the Al Saud clan was forced to move to Kuwait after Riyadh had fallen to the Al Rashid family. Abdul-Aziz ibn Saud head of the clan requested supplies and men from the Kuwaiti Emir to retake his home town. The Kuwaiti prince, who was also involved in several wars with Rashidis, acceded to Ibn Saud's request and gave him horses and arms.

In January 1902, Ibn Saud and his men returned to Riyadh and successfully assaulted the castle. He captured and killed Ibn Ajlan (Chief of Riyadh) after morning prayers, and Abdul Aziz held Ibn Ajlan's head and threw it to the people of Riyadh.

Abdul Aziz's victory marked the start of three decades of fighting that would ultimately see him unite nearly all of central Arabia under his rule. It also marked the beginning of the Third Saudi State, which evolved into present-day Saudi Arabia.

See also
 History of Saudi Arabia

References

Riyadh 1902
Riyadh 1902
1902 in Saudi Arabia
20th century in Riyadh